Gardenview Horticultural Park (16 acres) is a nonprofit botanical garden and arboretum located at 16711 Pearl Road, Strongsville, Ohio. It is open weekend afternoons to non-members; an admission fee is charged.

The park was begun in 1949 by horticulturist Henry Ross (deceased 1/11/2014) on a private lot filled with blackberry brambles and weeds atop blue and yellow clay. In his extensive work on the garden, Ross has introduced dozens of cultivars including the white-leafed Ajuga 'Arctic Fox' and the mildew-resistant Monarda 'Gardenview Scarlet'. He opened the garden for public viewing in 1961. 

The park now includes  of English Cottage Gardens (emphasizing plants with variegated, golden, silver, or colored foliage) and a  arboretum. The arboretum contains some 2,500 unusual trees, including 500 varieties of flowering crabapples underplanted with daffodils. The garden also features azaleas, 1,500 tuberous rooted begonias, thousands of tulips, a cactus collection, and two ponds.

See also 
 List of botanical gardens in the United States

External links 
 Gardenview Horticultural Park

Protected areas of Cuyahoga County, Ohio
Botanical gardens in Ohio
Strongsville, Ohio